Samuel "Toothpick" Jones (December 14, 1925 – November 5, 1971) was an American Major League Baseball pitcher with the Cleveland Indians, Chicago Cubs, St. Louis Cardinals, San Francisco Giants, Detroit Tigers and the Baltimore Orioles between 1951 and 1964. He batted and threw right-handed.

Early career 

Born in Stewartsville, Ohio, Jones played for several Negro league teams, including the Orlando All-Stars and Oakland Larks in 1946; and the Cleveland Buckeyes, where he played under the management of Quincy Trouppe, in 1947 and 1948; and the Kansas City Royals, a "touring Negro League squad handpicked by Satchel Paige." In 1948-49 he played in Panama, and then, with the end of the Negro National League, played semi-pro ball until he was signed by the Indians organization in the fall of 1949, playing Class A ball in the season and winter ball for Panama in 1949–50.

Major League career 

Jones began his major league career with the Cleveland Indians in 1951.  When he entered a game on May 3, 1952, 39-year-old rookie Quincy Trouppe, a Negro league veteran, was behind the plate.  Together they formed the first black battery in American League history. Both Sam Jones and Quincy Trouppe played for the Cleveland Buckeyes in the Negro American League.

After the  season, the Tribe traded him to the Chicago Cubs for two players to be named later, one of whom was slugger Ralph Kiner. In , the Cubs traded him to the St. Louis Cardinals in a multi-player deal; prior to the  season, he was dealt this time to the San Francisco Giants for Bill White and Ray Jablonski. He was picked 25th by the expansion Houston Colt .45s in the  expansion draft, then traded to the Detroit Tigers for Bob Bruce and Manny Montejo. He rejoined the Cardinals for the  campaign and played 1964 with the Baltimore Orioles. He spent the final three years of his pro career as a relief pitcher with the Columbus Jets of the International League before retiring at the end of the 1967 season.

Legacy 

During his career, Jones was known for his sweeping curveball, in addition to a fastball and changeup. Stan Musial once remarked, "Sam had the best curveball I ever saw... He was quick and fast and that curve was terrific, so big it was like a change of pace. I've seen guys fall down on curves that became strikes."

On May 12 of the first of these three seasons, he no-hit the Pittsburgh Pirates 4–0 at Wrigley Field, becoming the first African American in Major League history to pitch a no-hitter. He achieved this after walking Gene Freese, Preston Ward (who was pinch-run for by Román Mejías) and Tom Saffell to begin the ninth inning, he left the bases loaded by striking out Dick Groat, Roberto Clemente and Frank Thomas in succession. His greatest year came with the Giants in 1959, when he led the league in both wins with 21 (tying him with Milwaukee Braves starters Lew Burdette and Warren Spahn) and ERA with 2.83. He was named 1959 National League Pitcher of the Year by The Sporting News, but finished a distant second to Early Wynn of the Chicago White Sox for the Cy Young Award. He was named to the NL All-Star team twice, in 1955 and 1959.

Death 

Jones died from a recurrence of neck cancer first diagnosed in 1962, in Morgantown, West Virginia on November 5, 1971 at the age of 45.

References

External links

Sam Jones at SABR (Baseball BioProject)

1925 births
1971 deaths
African-American baseball players
Atlanta Crackers players
Baltimore Orioles players
Baseball players from Ohio
Burials at Woodlawn Cemetery (Fairmont, West Virginia)
Deaths from cancer in West Virginia
Cangrejeros de Santurce (baseball) players
Chicago Cubs players
Cleveland Buckeyes players
Cleveland Indians players
Columbus Jets players
Detroit Tigers players
Indianapolis Indians players
Liga de Béisbol Profesional Roberto Clemente pitchers
Louisville Buckeyes players
Major League Baseball pitchers
National League All-Stars
National League ERA champions
National League strikeout champions
National League wins champions
Oakland Larks players
People from Belmont County, Ohio
San Diego Padres (minor league) players
St. Louis Cardinals players
San Francisco Giants players
Toronto Maple Leafs (International League) players
Wilkes-Barre Indians players
20th-century African-American sportspeople
American expatriate baseball players in Nicaragua